Chris Bartley may refer to:

 Chris Bartley (rower) (born 1984), British rower
 Chris Bartley (singer) (1947–2009), American singer